The men's high jump event at the 1997 European Athletics U23 Championships was held in Turku, Finland, on 11 and 13 July 1997.

Medalists

Results

Final
13 July

Qualifications
11 July
Qualify: first 12 to the Final

Group A

Group B

Participation
According to an unofficial count, 16 athletes from 12 countries participated in the event.

 (1)
 (2)
 (2)
 (2)
 (1)
 (1)
 (2)
 (1)
 (1)
 (1)
 (1)
 (1)

References

High jump
High jump at the European Athletics U23 Championships